The National Forest Foundation, an American non-profit organization, was created by Congress in 1992 to be the official non-profit partner of the United States Forest Service. Its mission is to engage Americans in community-based national programs that promote the health and public enjoyment of the 193 million acre National Forest System. The foundation receives funding from Congress, soliciting additional funds from the private sector. The Forest Service is prohibited by law from soliciting outside funding, but the foundation has been expressly designated to fulfill that function.

References

 John F. Mongillo, Linda Zierdt-Warshaw, Encyclopedia of Environmental Science, p. 159. Boydell & Brewer, 2000, .

External links
 

Foundation
United States Forest Service
Nature conservation organizations based in the United States
Non-profit organizations based in Montana
Organizations based in Missoula, Montana
1992 establishments in Montana